Sayyid Muhammad al-Tijani al-Samawi (born 2 February 1943) is a Tunisian ex-Sunni Twelver Shi'i scholar, academic and theologian.

Personal life
Al-Tijani was born in Tunisian Sunni Muslim family of Maliki creed. Previously, his family added “al-Tijani” to their name after adopting Tijaniyyah Sufi tariqa of Ahmad al-Tijani. He was eighteen years of age when the Les Scouts Tunisiens agreed to send him as one of six Tunisian representatives to the first conference for Islamic and Arab scouts which took place in Mecca. He used the opportunity to perform mandatory pilgrimage. He stayed twenty five days in Saudi Arabia, during which he met many prominent Salafi scholars, listened to their lectures and became heavily influenced by Salafiyya. Upon returning to Tunisia, al-Tijani started actively promoting and spreading Salafiyya during the religious classes and sermons that he gave, including in the Great Mosque of Kairouan. He then traveled to Egypt’s al-Azhar. On the way back to Tunisia, Al-Tijani met a Shia Iraqi lecturer from the University of Baghdad named Mun'im. He came to Cairo to submit his Ph.D. thesis at al-Azhar University. Mun'im invited him to Iraq. Al-Samawi spent several weeks with Mun'im; visited Baghdad and Najaf, and met with several leading Shi'a scholars. These included: Abu al-Qasim al-Khoei, Muhammad Baqir al-Sadr and Muhammad Husayn Tabataba'i, who taught him about Shia Islam. After long debates with the Shia scholars, he became a Shia muslim, following the Jafari Madhab.

Works 
Al-Tijani's books are banned in some countries, such as Saudi Arabia and Malaysia. He has written six books:
 Then I Was Guided
 Ask Those Who Know
 To Be with the Truthful
 The Shi'ah are the real Ahlul-Sunnah
 All Solutions Are with the Prophet's Progeny
 Black Thursday

References

External links

 A series of books by Muhammad al-Tijani with English translations
 Striving for Right Guidance — A speech delivered by Dr. Muhammad al-Tijani al-Samawi

1943 births
Living people
Tunisian Shia clerics
Tunisian Shia Muslims
Converts to Shia Islam from Sunni Islam
Critics of Sunni Islam
Tunisian theologians